Partners & Spade, established in 2008 by Andy Spade and Anthony Sperduti, is a branding studio in New York City, USA. Partners & Spade works across a range of disciplines including advertising, retail concepts, branding, experiential marketing and design.

Notable work

Brand development 
 In 2013, launched Sleepy Jones, a line of loungewear inspired by the lifestyles of artists like David Hockney, Pablo Picasso, and Jean Seberg.
 Helped launch Harry's, an online-only line of men's grooming products.

Marketing 
 Conceptualized and designed J.Crew's first menswear shop, known as the Liquor Store, at West Broadway and White Street in Tribeca.
 Developed and produced Whole Foods' first national advertising campaign.

Store design 
 Warby Parker Class Trip traveling school bus.
 Warby Parker's first flagship store, located in SoHo.
 Warby Parker retail stores in Atlanta, Boston, Chicago, Dallas, Los Angeles, Miami, Nashville, San Francisco, Seattle and Washington DC 
 Sonos's first flagship store, located in SoHo.
 Boerum House & Home store, located in Brooklyn.

Films 
 Produced The Black Balloon, which won the U.S. Short Fiction prize at the 2012 Sundance Film Festival.
 Conceived the story for The Pleasure of Being Robbed with Red Bucket Films, which was chosen for the Director's Fortnight at the Cannes Film Festival in 2008 and purchased by IFC Films.
 Paperboys, a documentary by Mike Mills.
 Dimmer, a documentary by Talmage Cooley that was short-listed for the Academy Awards and included in the Museum of Modern Art's Sundance film collection.

References

External links 
 

Companies based in New York City
Publishing companies of the United States
AOL
Product design
Athletic shoes
Hudson's Bay Company